Malawi and Tanzania have formal relations. The two countries have a dispute over their border in Lake Malawi.

References

 
Tanzania
Bilateral relations of Tanzania